Vilmos Aba-Novák (March 15, 1894 – September 29, 1941) was a Hungarian painter and graphic artist. He was an original representative of modern art in his country, and specifically of its modern monumental painting. He was also the celebrated author of frescoes and church murals at Szeged and Budapest, and was officially patronized by the Hungarian nobility.

Biography 

Novák was born in Budapest, Hungary, where he would also die. His father was Gyula Novák, and the mother was Rosa Waginger ( from Vienna.

After studying at the Art School until 1912, he began work under Adolf Fényes. Between 1912 and 1914, Novák studied at the College of Fine Arts in Budapest. Completing his service in the Austro-Hungarian Army on the Eastern Front during World War I, he took up drawing with Viktor Olgyai.

Between 1921 and 1923, he spent his summers with the group of artists in Szolnok and Baia Mare (Nagybánya), Romania (see Baia Mare School), and was first exhibited in 1924. He was sent by the Hungarian Academy as a Fellow on a scholarship to Rome (1928 and 1930).

Aba Novák painted many frescoes for the Roman Catholic Church of Jászszentandrás, and Hõsök Kapuja (Heroes' Gate - a rare Hungarian example of novecento architecture, commemorating World War I soldiers) in Szeged in 1936 (the latter was white-washed after 1945, restored between 1986 and 2000), and painted many commissions for the Hungarian government. Aba also worked on frescoes of the St. Stephen's Mausoleum in Székesfehérvár and on the Church in Városmajor, Budapest, in 1938. The jury's Grand Prize at the Paris World Exhibition in 1937 and the 1940 Venice Biennale were both awarded to him.

He was a teacher at the College of Fine Arts from 1939 until his death.

References

External links 
 Works at Wikiart
 Works at Artnet
 Robert Edwards, Vilmos Aba Novák

1894 births
1941 deaths
Artists from Budapest
Hungarian painters
Expressionist painters
Hungarian people of Austrian descent
Burials at Farkasréti Cemetery